The Thai Ambassador in Berlin is the official representative of the Government in Bangkok to the Government of Germany.

List of representatives

References 

 
Germany
Thailand